The Battle of Udycz of 28 January 1606 was an engagement between the Polish–Lithuanian Commonwealth forces under hetman Stanisław Żółkiewski and the horde of Crimean Tatars under Khan Temir. Żółkiewski defeated Khan Temir's forces near Udych River (Удич).

References
Stanisław Żółkiewski: Pisma Stanisława Żółkiewskiego, kanclerza koronnego i hetmana. Lwów: Adam Bielowski, 1861, p. 389-391.
Stanisław Kozłowski: Stanisław Żołkiewski, kanclerz koronny i hetman (1547-1620). openlibrary.org, p. 33-34.
Maurycy Horn. Chronologia i zasięg najazdów tatarskich na ziemie Rzeczypospolitej Polskiej w latach 1600–1647. „SMHW”. VIII/1, p. 8-9, 1962. Białystok. ISSN 0562-2786.
Dariusz Skorupa: Stosunki polsko-tatarskie 1595–1623. Warszawa: PAN, 2004, p. 136. .

Udycz 1606
Udycz 1606
Udycz
1606 in Europe
17th century in Ukraine